There are three species of lizard named imbricate alligator lizard:
 Barisia imbricata
 Barisia ciliaris
 Barisia jonesi